Avinita (469–529 CE) was the Western Ganga Dynasty king who ascended the throne after King Madhava III. He was followed to the throne by his son, Durvinita, though Durvinita was not his choice. Jain Acharya Vijaykirti was his teacher and advisor.

Notes

References

 Dr. Suryanath U. Kamat, A Concise history of Karnataka from pre-historic times to the present, Jupiter books, MCC, Bangalore, 2001 (Reprinted 2002) OCLC: 7796041

469 births
529 deaths
5th-century Indian monarchs
6th-century Indian monarchs
Hindu monarchs